There are at least 56 named lakes and reservoirs in Jefferson County, Arkansas.

Lakes
	Atkins Lake, el.  
	Bernett Lake, el.  
	Big Grassy Brake, el.  
	Brean Lake, el.  
	Brushy Lake, el.  
	Clear Pond, el.  
	Dilly Pond, el.  
	Dudley Lake, el.  
	English Lake, el.  
	Farelly Lake, el.  
	Felix Pond, el.  
	Five Forks Lake, el.  
	Hannaberry Lake, el.  
	Horseshoe Lake, el.  
	Horseshoe Pond, el.  
	Imbeau Bayou, el.  
	Johnson Lake, el.  
	Johnson Lake, el.  
	Lake Dick, el.  
	Langford Lake, el.  
	Long Lake, el.  
	Mud Lake, el.  
	Noble Lake, el.  
	Old River Lake, el.  
	Patton Lake, el.  
	Reed Lake, el.  
	Swan Lake, el.  
	Wilkins Lake, el.  
	Willow Lake, el.

Reservoirs
	Arsenal Lake, el.  
	Clean Water Holding Pond, el.  
	Clear Water Holding Pond, el.  
	Hardin Lake, el.  
	Hardin Lake Number Two, el.  
	Jones Lake, el.  
	Lake Langhofer, el.  
	Lake Lee, el.  
	Lake Pine Bluff, el.  
	Marks Lake, el.  
	Midland Lake, el.  
	Neely Lake, el.  
	Oakley Lake, el.  
	Phillips Lake, el.  
	Pool Five, el.  
	Pool Four, el.  
	Pool Three, el.  
	Robinson Lake, el.  
	Rust Lake Number One, el.  
	Rust Lake Number Two, el.  
	Shady Oaks Reservoir, el.  
	Suburbia Lake, el.  
	Surge Pond, el.  
	Taliaferro Lake, el.  
	Ta-Lo-Ha-Lake, el.  
	Tulley Lake, el.  
	Yellow Lake, el.

See also

 List of lakes in Arkansas

Notes

Bodies of water of Jefferson County, Arkansas
Jefferson